Group Megavisión is a Salvadoran broadcasting company that operates three television channels and more than twenty national radio stations. It was founded by Óscar Antonio Safie. 

It began with the creation of the news service, Channel 21, in 1994. Later Channel 19 targeted a female audience. In 2001, Group Megavisión created its third channel, Channel 15, named ESTV, "Salvadoran Television". In 2007, Channel 15 was shuttered after struggling to build an audience. In 2012, Channel 15 returned to the air and is now under the name of Movie World TV.

Collaboration 
In 1998, Group Megavisión partnered with Nickelodeon to carry the network's animated and youth-focused content.
In 2006, Group Megavisión partnered with MTV Networks and VH1. 
In 2009, Group Megavisión partnered with six additional television stations in El Salvador.

National Production

Canal 21 (Channel 21) 
Channel 21 features a variety of programming suitable for all ages, including:
 Get Up My People
 Telenoticias 21
 Fanatical+
 The Basement
 My Country TV
 Dialogue with Ernesto López 
 7 Days (News of the Week)
 EXIT
 Code 21
 21 a la Carte
 Thinking out Loud
 Extreme culture

Canal (Channel) 19  
The original content of Canal 19 featured the programming of Nickelodeon. In May 2012, Channel 19 was restructured and began broadcasting Channel 21 programs.

MegaNoticias Canal 19 (MegaNews Channel 19)
In August 2012, Group Megavisión launched  "El nuevo Canal 19" which featured political, economic, business and international news, sports and opinion programs.

Movie World (Canal 15) 
In July 2012, Group Megavisión launched Movie World on Channel 15, broadcasting films in the genres of terror, drama, comedy, romance and action.

Group Megavisión Radio Stations  
 Radio Corazón 97.3 Fm VHF
 Radio Fuego 107.7 Fm VHF
 Sonso Mix 92.5 Fm VHF (Sonsonate)
 Radio La Libertad 98.1 Fm VHF (La Libertad)
 Radio Megahits 92.5 Fm VHF (Ahuachapán)
 Mi Radio 98.1 Fm VHF (San Vicente)
 Radio Jiboa 90.5 Fm VHF (San Vicente)

Mass media companies of El Salvador